Charleen Badman is an American chef and co-owner of the FnB restaurant in Scottsdale, Arizona, who won the 2019 Best Chef in the Southwest James Beard Award.  It was the first time since 2007 that a chef from Arizona won the award.

Badman is a past President of the Phoenix, Arizona chapter of Les Dames d'Escoffier.

Biography
Badman’s father Donn was a construction worker.  A high school program in Tucson, Arizona introduced her to the restaurant industry.  She worked at a restaurant named Terra Cotta during her senior year and when she graduated in 1989, she was put in charge of the million dollar catering arm of the restaurant. She left when she found out Anne Rosenzweig was opening a new restaurant. For the next six years she worked at Rosenzweig‘s Lobster Club.

When Rosenzweig opened the West Village restaurant Inside in 2001, Badman was put in charge but the September 11 attacks on the nearby World Trade Center led to her decision to return to Arizona.  Together with Pavle Milic, she opened FnB.

References

External links
FnB restaurant

Living people
American women restaurateurs
American restaurateurs
American women chefs
Chefs from Arizona
People from Tucson, Arizona
James Beard Foundation Award winners
Restaurant founders
Year of birth missing (living people)